Magoo may refer to:
Mr. Magoo, a cartoon character
 Mr. Magoo (film)
Magoo (rapper) (born 1973), American rapper
Magoo (band), an indie rock band from Norfolk, England
Magoo (Australian producer), Australian music producer
Chris Exall or Magoo, guitarist for the Anti-Nowhere League
Tory Christman or Magoo, Church of Scientology critic
DUKW or Magoo, a World War II amphibious vehicle
Dick Megugorac, an American land speed racer and customizer

See also
Magu (disambiguation)